Austin Krajicek and César Ramírez are the defending champions, but only Ramírez defended his title partnering Miguel Ángel Reyes-Varela, but lost in the semifinals to Nicolás Barrientos and Eduardo Struvay.

Barrientos and Struvay won the title defeating Alejandro Gómez and Felipe Mantilla in the final, 7–6(8–6), 6–7(4–7), [10–4].

Seeds

Draw

References
 Main Draw

Seguros Bolivar Open Medellin - Doubles
2015 Doubles